The Lloyd Wright Home and Studio is a historic two-story house in West Hollywood, California, U.S.. It was built in 1927. It was designed by architect Lloyd Wright a son of Frank Lloyd Wright. It has been listed on the National Register of Historic Places since April 6, 1987.

References

Houses on the National Register of Historic Places in California
Houses completed in 1927
1927 establishments in California
Houses in Los Angeles County, California
Buildings and structures in West Hollywood, California